East Shoreham is a hamlet and census-designated place (CDP) in the Suffolk County town of Brookhaven, New York, United States. The population was 6,841 at the 2020 census.

Geography
East Shoreham is located on the northern shore of Long Island, by Long Island Sound. It shares a zip code (11786) with the neighboring village of Shoreham. Despite its official name, East Shoreham is invariably referred to by its inhabitants as "Shoreham", while the adjoining village is often called "Shoreham Village".

East Shoreham is bordered to the east by Wading River in the town of Riverhead, to the south by Ridge, to the southwest by Rocky Point, to the west by the village of Shoreham, and to the north by Long Island Sound.

Demographics

Education

Shoreham, East Shoreham and the neighboring hamlet of Wading River form the Shoreham-Wading River School District.

Demographics for the CDP
At the 2020 census, there were 6,841 people in 2,023 households inside of the CDP. The population density was 1,267.1 per square mile (489.2/km2). There were 1,934 housing units at an average density of 357.6/sq mi (138.0/km2). The racial makeup of the CDP was 88.6% White, 3.5% African American, 0.13% Native American, 3.4% Asian, 0.06% Pacific Islander, 3.23% from other races, and 3.6% from two or more races. Hispanic or Latino of any race were 10.2% of the population.

There were 1,787 households, of which 48.2% had children under the age of 18 living with them, 78.6% were married couples living together, 7.8% had a female householder with no husband present, and 11.1% were non-families. 9.0% of all households were made up of individuals, and 3.1% had someone living alone who was 65 years of age or older. The average household size was 3.20 and the average family size was 3.40.

29.9% of the population were under the age of 18, 7.0% from 18 to 24, 27.6% from 25 to 44, 28.0% from 45 to 64, and 7.5% who were 65 years of age or older. The median age was 37 years. For every 100 females, there were 100.0 males. For every 100 females age 18 and over, there were 95.9 males.

The median income was $85,916 and the median family income was $88,020. Males had a median income of $61,359 and females $35,536. The per capita income was $29,485. About 3.4% of families and 4.1% of the population were below the poverty threshold, including 2.3% of those under age 18 and 8.4% of those age 65 or over.

References

Brookhaven, New York
Hamlets in New York (state)
Long Island Sound
Census-designated places in New York (state)
Census-designated places in Suffolk County, New York
Hamlets in Suffolk County, New York
Populated coastal places in New York (state)